Einar Friis Baastad (8 May 1890 – 1968) was a Norwegian football player. He was born in Kristiania. He played for the Norwegian national team, and competed at the 1912 Summer Olympics in Stockholm. He was Norwegian champion with the club Mercantile in 1907 and 1912.

References

External links

1890 births
1968 deaths
Footballers from Oslo
Norwegian footballers
Norway international footballers
Footballers at the 1912 Summer Olympics
Olympic footballers of Norway

Association football defenders